Lazar Kuburović (born 22 December 1992) is a Danish martial artist who represented his native country Danemark in sport jujitsu and at amateur level in judo. In 2014 he represented his homeland Montenegro. He was born in montenegrin town Andrijevica but he was growing up in danish capital city Copenhagen. He was practicing ju-jitsu at Frederiksberg Ju-Jutsu Klub under supervision of danish ex top jutsuka Anders Lauridsen. He is winner of World Games in Cali from 2013 and two times world champion – 2012 and 2014 in discipline Fighting System, −94 kg weight category. He retired from top sport after finishing university studies. He works as dentist.

References 

1992 births
Living people
Danish martial artists
Montenegrin martial artists
World Games gold medalists
Competitors at the 2013 World Games